South Floral Park (formerly known as Jamaica Square) is a village in the Town of Hempstead in Nassau County, on Long Island, in New York, United States. The population was 1,741 at the 2020 census. 

At , the Incorporated Village of South Floral Park is the smallest village in the State of New York by total area.

History 
The Village of South Floral Park was incorporated in November 1925 as the Village of Jamaica Square. This name had been used since the area was first developed ca. 1905; the name was originally chosen so as to reflect the fact that it was down the road from Jamaica, Queens and next to Franklin Square. However its name was changed to South Floral Park in 1931 due to confusion with said neighborhood in Queens; the new name was chosen based on the fact that the village is located immediately south of and adjacent to Floral Park. 

Residents decided to incorporate their community because they felt that the Town of Hempstead was unable to adequately fulfill the needs of their community, and believed that a more localized government would be able to govern it better.

South Floral Park was one of the earliest racially integrated villages on Long Island.

Geography

South Floral Park is the smallest village in the State of New York by total area.

Climate 
The Village of South Floral Park features a humid subtropical climate (Cfa) under the Köppen climate classification,. As such, the village experiences hot, humid summers and cold winters, and experiences precipitation throughout the entirety of the year.

Economy 
The Village of South Floral Park is considered to be a bedroom community of the City of New York.

The village itself is residential in character, consisting of a single residential zoning district which covers South Floral Park in its entirety. As such, there are no areas zoned for commercial or industrial uses anywhere within South Floral Park. 

The majority of lots in the village consist of single-family residential homes, with the only major exception being the village hall and fire station complex.

Demographics

2020 census

Note: the US Census treats Hispanic/Latino as an ethnic category. This table excludes Latinos from the racial categories and assigns them to a separate category. Hispanics/Latinos can be of any race.

2000 Census
At the 2000 census there were 1,578 people, 456 households, and 383 families in the village. The population density was 15,776.3 people per square mile (6,092.7/km). There were 462 housing units at an average density of 4,618.9 per square mile (1,783.8/km). The racial makeup of the village was 22.18% White, 59.06% African American, 0.25% Native American, 3.80% Asian, 6.15% from other races, and 8.56% from two or more races. Hispanic or Latino of any race were 13.56%.

Of the 456 households 35.3% had children under the age of 18 living with them, 54.8% were married couples living together, 22.1% had a female householder with no husband present, and 16.0% were non-families. 12.3% of households were one person and 5.9% were one person aged 65 or older. The average household size was 3.46 and the average family size was 3.72.

The age distribution was 26.7% under the age of 18, 7.9% from 18 to 24, 28.5% from 25 to 44, 25.0% from 45 to 64, and 11.9% 65 or older. The median age was 36 years. For every 100 females, there were 97.0 males. For every 100 females age 18 and over, there were 87.8 males.

The median household income was $64,205 and the median family income was $68,000. Males had a median income of $36,250 versus $37,292 for females. The per capita income for the village was $21,091. About 0.8% of families and 2.8% of the population were below the poverty line, including none of those under age 18 and 6.3% of those age 65 or over.

Government 
As of August 2022, the Mayor of South Floral Park is Nyakya T. Brown, the Deputy Mayor is Jennifer Bellamy, and the Village Trustees are Jennifer Bellamy, LeRoy Graham, Jr., Randy Jaques, and Porscha Lyons.

The South Floral Park Village Hall is located in the heart of the village, at 383 Roquette Ave.

Education 
South Floral Park, in its entirety, is located within the boundaries of (and is thus served by) the Elmont Union Free School District for elementary education and the Sewanhaka Central High School District for secondary education. As such, all children who reside within the village and attend public schools go to school in one of these two districts, depending on what grade they are in.

References

External links 

 Official website

Hempstead, New York
Villages in New York (state)
Villages in Nassau County, New York